Kok Zhailau is a plateau in the Trans-Ili Alatau.

The plateau is part of the Ile-Alatau National Park, a protected area.  Almaty, ski resort Shymbulak, Medeu and Big Almaty peak can be seen from the plateau.

Flora and Fauna

There is a number of endangered species, insects and plants that inhabit the Kok-Zhailau plateau. These include 145 species of diurnal butterflies (Parnassius apollo, Tien-Shan apollo, Mountain Apollo, Karanasa dublitzkyi carnase, Karins dublitzkyi and others), 252 species of ground beetles, 110 species of bees, 97 species of burrowing wasps and 33 species of ants.

There are also 105 of birds in the area including the black stork, the eagle-dwarf, the golden eagle, the kumai, the shahin, the serpoklyuv, the eagle owl, the peregrine falcon and others.

Animals include the Tien Shan shrew, the red pika, the gray marmot, the Tien Shan mouse, the silver vole, the mountain goat, the roe deer, wild boar, foxes and squirrels.

Endangered animals include the Tien Shan brown bear, the stone marten, the Central Asian river otter, the manul, the Turkestan lynx, the Indian porcupine and the snow leopard.

The area includes tulips of Ostrovsky and Zinaida, Alatava saffron (Crocus alatavicus), as well as medicinal plants and spices (oregano, peppermint and others).

Tourism
The Kok-Zhailau plateau is a popular tourist attraction. The area is accessible for hiking, biking, skiing, and horse riding. It is the only reachable area within the Ile-Alatau National Park.

The area is major tourist attraction on account of its unspoilt nature. Ecotourism is prevalent in the area. This also includes scientific ecotourism, cognitive ecotourism, blindwatching, botanical excursions, video and photo excursions, ethnic tourism and other activities.

To climb the Kok-Zhaylau is necessary to make an ascent on the Northern watershed of the gorge. This route is very popular due to the fact that during one day from the Kok-Zhailau plateau, you can make different hikes: 1) on the Terisbutak river, make a descent to The Big Almaty gorge– to the city along the "Observatorsky comb"; 2) along the Kamenskiy ridge to the health resort "AK Kain" through the Maloalmatinsky and Kamenskoye gorges, etc.

The key point that attracts European tourists to Kazakhstan, according to the opinion tourism professionals are pristine nature and its corners, which are similar to Ile Alatau national park. In recent years, ecotourism tourism has become famous all over the world, who pays little attention to the surrounding environment. There are hiking trails of various difficulty levels in the tract. There are places for camping. Information stands were installed with a description of the animals living here and information about rare plants. The end point of the trail to Kok Zhailau is considered to be a waterfall.

Controversy

The former president of the Republic of Kazakhstan, Nursultan Nazarbayev, gave way to build a major ski complex within the Ile-Alatau National Park. This will involve modifications to the Kok-Zhailau plateau and Kumbel mountains. The resort is scheduled to include ski runs, guesthouses and hotels. The region is considered as a protected natural reserve area and thus the project has caused controversy.

WHC UNESCO 
The UNESCO world heritage center recommended that the leadership of Kazakhstan abandon the project to build a ski resort on the territory of the Ile-Alatau national natural Park. At the same time, the great importance of the development of eco-tourism and the nomination of protected areas in the UNESCO world natural heritage list indicate. The President of the world Heritage center Mr. Kishor RAO, requests information from the Kazakh government regarding this project, but there is no answer yet.

References

East Kazakhstan Region
Plateaus of Kazakhstan
Plateaus of Asia